Lisec is a village in the municipality of Tetovo, North Macedonia.

Demographics
According to the 2021 census, the village had a total of 384 inhabitants. Ethnic groups in the village include:

Albanians 340
Macedonians 5
Others 39

References

External links

Villages in Tetovo Municipality
Albanian communities in North Macedonia